Piraro is a surname. Notable people with the surname include:

Dan Piraro (born 1958), American painter, illustrator, and cartoonist
Sam Piraro (born 1951), American baseball coach